Myeongjang is a dong in Dongnae-gu, Busan, South Korea.  It is divided into two administrative dong, Myeongjang 1-dong and Myeongjang 2-dong. The total area is 1.78 km2, with a population of 39,656.  It borders Geumjeong-gu on the north.  The old site of the Dongnae eupseong site is located in Myeongjang-dong.

The name "Myeongjang" was first applied to this region in the early Joseon Dynasty.  The area was officially designated Myeongjang-ri in 1740.  It gained dong status in 1953.  It was split into two administrative dong in 1990.  Each dong office has ten employees.

See also
Geography of South Korea
Subdivisions of South Korea

External links
Myeongjang 1-dong website, in Korean
Myeongjang 2-dong website, in Korean

Dongnae District
Neighbourhoods in Busan